Club Unión Huaral is a Peruvian football club, from the city of Huaral. It was founded in 1947 and plays in Peru's Segunda División.

History
The club was the 1976 and 1989 Peruvian Primera División champion. They were the first club to take the Peruvian title out of the traditional strongholds of Lima and Callao provinces.

The club have played at the highest level of Peruvian football on twenty four occasions, from 1974 Torneo Descentralizado until 1991 Torneo Descentralizado, 1993 Torneo Descentralizado, 1995 Torneo Descentralizado, and from 2003 Torneo Descentralizado until 2006 Torneo Descentralizado, when was relegated to the Peruvian Segunda División.

In the 2011 Torneo Intermedio, the club was eliminated by Deportivo Municipal in the Round of 16. In 2013, the club had a great campaign in the Copa Perú finishing runner-up. They were once again promoted to the Peruvian Segunda División.

Notable players

Honours

National

League
Peruvian Primera División: 2
Winners (2): 1976, 1989
Runner-up (1): 1974

Torneo Regional: 1
Winners (1): 1989-II
Runner-up (2): 1987, 1988

Torneo Interzonal:
Runner-up (1): 1978

Torneo Zonal: 0
Runner-up (1): 1992

Peruvian Segunda División: 4
Winners (4): 1973, 1992, 1994, 2002

Copa Perú: 0
Runner-up (1): 2013

Regional
Región IV:
Winners (1): 2013

Liga Departamental de Lima:
Winners (1): 1973
Runner-up (1): 2013

Liga Provincial de Huaral:
Winners (5): 1972, 1973, 2009, 2011, 2012
Runner-up (1): 2013

Liga Distrital de Huaral:
Winners (4): 2009, 2011, 2012, 2013

Performance in CONMEBOL competitions
Copa Libertadores: 3 appearances
1975: First Round
1977: First Round
1990: Second Round

See also
List of football clubs in Peru
Peruvian football league system

Football clubs in Peru
Association football clubs established in 1947
1947 establishments in Peru